Joseph Chongo (born 25 January 1965) is a Zambian boxer. He competed at the 1988 Summer Olympics, 1992 Summer Olympics and the 1996 Summer Olympics.

References

1965 births
Living people
Zambian male boxers
Olympic boxers of Zambia
Boxers at the 1988 Summer Olympics
Boxers at the 1992 Summer Olympics
Boxers at the 1996 Summer Olympics
Place of birth missing (living people)
Bantamweight boxers